The 1993–94 EHF Champions League was the first edition of Europe's premier men handball clubs competition after being rebranded as such. It was won by CB Cantabria (then known as TEKA Santander), who had won the EHF Cup the past season, in a final against Académico BC Braga, who became the first Portuguese team to reach a continental final.

It was the first of eight Champions League trophies in a row won by Spanish clubs, ending the dominance of Eastern European handball.

Preliminary round

|}

First round

|}

Eight finals

|}

Group stage

Group A

Group B

Final

References
   EHF

C
C
EHF Champions League seasons